Valea Lupului is a commune in Iași County, Western Moldavia, Romania. The commune is composed of a single village, Valea Lupului. It is part of the Iași metropolitan area.

The settlement is located to the north-west of Iași, on the left bank of Bahlui river. The national road DN28 Iași - Roman is at the southern limit.

References

Communes in Iași County
Localities in Western Moldavia